Kochadhaman is a village in Kishanganj district of Bihar state of India.

See also 
 Kishanganj district

References 

Villages in Kishanganj district